Payakaraopeta Mandal is one of the 46 mandals in Anakapalli District of Andhra Pradesh. As per census 2011, there are 1 town and 18 villages.

Demographics 
Payakaraopeta Mandal has total population of 93,093 as per the Census 2011 out of which 46,825 are males while 46,268 are females and the Average Sex Ratio of Payakaraopeta Mandal is 988. The total literacy rate of Payakaraopeta Mandal is 63.18%. The male literacy rate is 60.03% and the female literacy rate is 52.61%.

Towns and villages

Towns 

 Payakaraopeta

 Ærætlâkœtå
Edatam	
Gopalapatnam
Guntapalle
Kandipudi
Kesavaram
Kumarapuram
Mangavaram
Masahebpeta
Namavaram
Padalavani
Palteru
Pedaramabhadrapuram
Pentakota
Rajavaram
S. Narasapuram
Satyavaram
Srirampuram

See also 
List of mandals in Andhra Pradesh

References 

Mandals in Anakapalli district